Aricidea is a genus of small paraonid worms, which are sub-surface deposit feeders and bioturbators.  Aricidea worms have a prostomial antenna, with all Aricidea species (except those in the subgenus Aedicira) possessing neuropodial thickened chaetae.

References 

Polychaete genera